Ralph Moses Paiewonsky (November 9, 1907 in Saint Thomas, Danish West Indies – November 9, 1991, in Saint Thomas, U.S. Virgin Islands) was a businessman and politician who served as the ninth civilian governor of the United States Virgin Islands from 1961–1969.

Ralph Paiewonsky was the son of Jewish Lithuanian immigrants to the Danish West Indies.  He graduated from New York University in 1930. His degree was in chemistry. His father owned A.H. Riise & Co. Ltd. an apothecary, general store, and a bay rum distillery in St. Thomas. After he returned to the Virgin Islands his father bought the government-owned beverage rum distillery on St. Croix. Ralph Paiewonsky found out that the shortage of water-limited expansion. He proceeded to develop yeast strains that could ferment a mixture of molasses and seawater. After he and his brother Isidor Paiewonsky managed various family businesses, and was the founder of the West Indies Bank and Trust Company in 1954 later acquired by Chase Manhattan.  In 1961, he was appointed Governor by President John F. Kennedy.

Paiewonsky's administration established the Department of Housing and Community Renewal in 1962, and began a program of land acquisition and home construction.  Approximately 8,000 new homes were built under this program during Paiewonsky's term.  He also supported public education reforms and the establishment of the University of the Virgin Islands in 1962.  When he appeared on the TV show "To Tell The Truth" he donated his winnings to the University of the Virgin Islands.  Paiewonsky served as chairman of the university's board of directors until his death; the university's library on St. Thomas is named for Paiewonsky.

Paiewonsky was a delegate to Democratic National Conventions between 1940 and 1960, and served as National Democratic Committeeman from the Virgin Islands.  He was awarded honorary degrees from Tufts University and Fairleigh Dickinson University in 1967.  In 1991, he published an autobiography, "Memoirs of A Governor."

External links
 Profile, "Prominent U.S. Virgin Islanders
 Paiewonsky Library page, University of the Virgin Islands

1907 births
1991 deaths
Governors of the United States Virgin Islands
University of the Virgin Islands faculty
United States Virgin Islands Jews
United States Virgin Islands people of Lithuanian-Jewish descent
Jewish American government officials
People from Saint Thomas, U.S. Virgin Islands
Democratic Party of the Virgin Islands politicians
20th-century American Jews
New York University alumni